Happily Ever After is a 1985 Brazilian erotic romantic drama film directed by Bruno Barreto.

It was released in the United States in November 1986.

Plot
Fernanda is a married woman with two children who meets Miguel, a male prostitute after hitting him in a car accident. They meet again when he steals her wallet and drops an advertising of the club where he works. When her husband travels, Fernanda and Miguel go to Santos, saying they would accompany until the port a woman who would go to Paris. They go aboard a ship that goes to Salvador, where they pass the New Year's Day. However, when Fernanda eventually discovers Miguel is a cocaine addict she returns to her family.

Cast
 Regina Duarte as Fernanda
 Paulo Castelli as Miguel
 Patricio Bisso as Bom-Bom
 Flávio Galvão as Roberto
 Felipe Martins as Ratinho
 Walter Forster
 Maria Helena Dias
 Flávio São Thiago
 Ivan Setta

Reception
At the 3rd Bogota Film Festival, Happily Ever After won the Best Director, Best Screenplay and Best Actor (Castelli).

References

External links

1985 romantic drama films
1985 films
Brazilian romantic drama films
Films directed by Bruno Barreto
1980s erotic drama films
Brazilian erotic drama films
1980s Portuguese-language films